Megachile abessinica is a species of bee in the family Megachilidae. It was described by Friese in 1915.

References

Abessinica
Insects described in 1915